Serafina Schachova, also known as Seraphima Schachova (1854-unknown) was a Russian Empire physician known for her discovery of the spiral tube of Schachova, part of the kidney's duct system.

She grew up in Ekaterinoslav, modern-day Ukraine, in a somewhat well-off family and an area rife with class tensions. She studied medicine at the University of Zurich from 1871 to 1873; while there, she researched the development of bone structure and tissue using a pigeon model. Schachova's time in Zurich ended abruptly when the Russian government required women to leave the city. She transferred to the University of Bern and worked with Theodor Langhans on kidney anatomy research using a canine model of induced nephritis. Schachova returned to Russia in 1878 and practiced medicine in that country until 1910, when she moved to Kharkhov, Ukraine. The details of the end of her life are not known.

References 

Physicians from Kharkiv
Scientists from Dnipro
Nephrologists
Women physicians from the Russian Empire